Gigolo is a 1926 American silent romance drama film produced by Cecil B. DeMille and released by Producers Distributing Corporation. William K. Howard directed and Rod La Rocque and Jobyna Ralston star. The film is based on a novel, Gigolo, by Edna Ferber.

Prints survive of this silent feature.

Cast
Rod La Rocque as Gideon Gory
Jobyna Ralston as Mary Hubbel
Louise Dresser as Julia Gory
Cyril Chadwick as Doctor Gerald Blagden
George Nichols as Pa Hubbel
Ina Anson as Dancer
Sally Rand as Tourist Girl in Paris
Eddie Borden as Gideon's Soldier Buddy (uncredited)
André Cheron as Headwaiter (uncredited)
Gino Corrado as Hotel Crillon Desk Clerk (uncredited)
Alphonse Martell as Waiter at Maxim's (uncredited)
Edward Peil Sr. as Paris Cafe Patron (uncredited)
Julian Rivero as Second Waiter (uncredited)
Philip Sleeman as Gigolo (uncredited)

References

External links

Lobby poster

1926 films
American silent feature films
Films based on American novels
Films directed by William K. Howard
1926 romantic drama films
American romantic drama films
American black-and-white films
Producers Distributing Corporation films
Films based on works by Edna Ferber
Films with screenplays by Garrett Fort
1920s American films
Silent romantic drama films
Silent American drama films